Sithum Disanayaka (born 8 March 2000) is a Sri Lankan cricketer. He made his List A debut on 14 December 2019, for Panadura Sports Club in the 2019–20 Invitation Limited Over Tournament.

References

External links
 

2000 births
Living people
Sri Lankan cricketers
Panadura Sports Club cricketers
Place of birth missing (living people)